Gentianella rupicola is a species of plant in the family Gentianaceae. It is endemic to Ecuador.  Its natural habitat is subtropical or tropical high-altitude grassland.

References

rupicola
Endemic flora of Ecuador
Least concern plants
Taxonomy articles created by Polbot